North Bloomfield is an unincorporated community in central Bloomfield Township, Trumbull County, Ohio, United States.  It lies at the intersection of State Routes 45 and 87 and has a post office with the ZIP code 44450. It is part of the Youngstown–Warren metropolitan area.

Education
Children in North Bloomfield are served by the Bloomfield-Mespo Local School District. The current schools serving the community are:
 Mesopotamia Elementary School – grades K-5
 Bloomfield Middle/High School – grades 6-12

References

Unincorporated communities in Trumbull County, Ohio
Unincorporated communities in Ohio